William F. Walker (December 1, 1937 – August 7, 2007) was the President of Auburn University from 2001 to 2004.

Biography
William F. Walker was born on December 1, 1937, in Sherman, Texas. He graduated with a B.A. and an M.A. in aerospace engineering from the University of Texas at Austin. He later got his Ph.D. in mechanical engineering from Oklahoma State University. From 1965 to 1988, he taught at Rice University. He then became Dean of the College of Engineering at Auburn University.

He endorsed Governor Bob Riley.

He died of cancer in 2007.

William F. Walker Teaching Awards
The Fred and Mary Lou Birdsong Teaching Awards were renamed as the William F. Walker Teaching Awards in 2001. The award is presented annually to an outstanding member of the Engineering faculty at Auburn.

References

1937 births
2007 deaths
People from Sherman, Texas
Cockrell School of Engineering alumni
Oklahoma State University alumni
Rice University faculty
Presidents of Auburn University
Deaths from cancer in the United States
20th-century American academics